The San Francisco Bay Area, often referred to as simply the Bay Area, is a populous metropolitan region surrounding the San Francisco, San Pablo, and Suisun Bay estuaries in Northern California. The Bay Area is defined by the Association of Bay Area Governments to include the nine counties that border the aforementioned estuaries: Alameda, Contra Costa, Marin, Napa, San Mateo, Santa Clara, Solano, Sonoma, and San Francisco. Other definitions may be either smaller or larger, and may include neighboring counties that do not border the bay such as Santa Cruz and San Benito (more often included in the Central Coast regions); or San Joaquin, Merced, and Stanislaus (more often included in the Central Valley). The core cities of the Bay Area are Oakland, San Francisco, and San Jose.

Home to approximately 7.76 million people, Northern California's nine-county Bay Area contains many cities, towns, airports, and associated regional, state, and national parks, connected by a complex multimodal transportation network. The Bay Area is known for its natural beauty, progressive politics, world-class universities, technology companies, and affluence. The larger federal classification, the combined statistical area of the region which includes fourteen counties, is the second-largest in California (after the Greater Los Angeles area), the fifth-largest in the United States, and the 41st-largest urban area in the world with 9.67 million people. The Bay Area's population is ethnically diverse: roughly three-fifths of the region's residents are Hispanic, Asian, African American, or Pacific Islander (with the other two-fifths being non-Hispanic White American), all of whom have a significant presence throughout the region.

The earliest archaeological evidence of human settlements in the Bay Area dates back to 8000–10,000 BCE (from shell mounds in the Coyote Hills). In 1769, the Bay Area was inhabited by Ohlone people when a Spanish exploration party led by Gaspar de Portolá entered the Bay – the first documented European visit to the Bay Area. After Mexico established independence from Spain in 1821, the region was briefly controlled by the Mexican government until the United States seized the territory in 1846 during the Mexican–American War. Soon after, discovery of gold in California attracted a flood of treasure seekers, many using ports in the Bay Area as an entry point. During the early years of California's statehood, state legislative business rotated between three locations in the Bay Area before a permanent state capital was established in Sacramento. A major earthquake leveled the city of San Francisco and environs in 1906, but the region quickly rebuilt in time to host the 1915 Panama-Pacific Exposition. During World War II, the Bay Area played a major role in America's war effort in the Asiatic-Pacific Theater, with the San Francisco Port of Embarkation, of which Fort Mason was one of fourteen installations and location of the headquarters, acting as a primary embarkation point for American forces. In 1945, the United Nations Charter was signed in San Francisco, establishing the United Nations, and in 1951, the Treaty of San Francisco re-established peaceful relations between Japan and the Allied Powers. Since then, the Bay Area has experienced numerous political, cultural and artistic movements, developing unique local genres in music and art and establishing itself as a hotbed of progressive politics. Economically, the post-war Bay Area saw huge growth in the financial and technology industries, creating an economy with a gross domestic product of over $700 billion, and home to the third-highest concentration of Fortune 500 companies in the United States (as of 2018). Despite a subsequent exodus of business from Downtown San Francisco and Oakland accelerated by the COVID-19 pandemic, the Bay Area is still the home to four of the world's ten largest companies by market capitalization, and San Francisco houses the headquarters of numerous companies inside and outside of technology, including Wells Fargo, Salesforce, Uber, Airbnb, Twitter, Levi's, Gap, Dropbox, and Lyft.

Despite its urban character, the San Francisco Bay is one of California's most ecologically important habitats, providing key ecosystem services such as filtering pollutants and sediments from the rivers and supporting a number of endangered species. In addition, the Bay is known for its stands of coast redwoods, many of which are protected in state and county parks. The region is additionally known for the complexity of its landforms, the result of millions of years of tectonic plate movements. Because the Bay Area is crossed by six major earthquake faults, the region is particularly exposed to hazards presented by large earthquakes. The climate is temperate and conducive to outdoor recreational and athletic activities such as hiking, running, and cycling. The Bay Area is host to six professional sports teams and is a cultural center for music, theater, and the arts. It is also host to higher education institutions, including research universities such as Stanford University and the University of California, Berkeley. Home to 101 municipalities and nine counties, governance in the Bay Area involves numerous local and regional jurisdictions, often with broad and overlapping responsibilities.

Boundaries

The borders of the San Francisco Bay Area are not officially delineated, and the unique development patterns influenced by the region's topography, as well as unusual commute patterns caused by the presence of three central cities and employment centers located in various suburban locales, has led to considerable disagreement between local and federal definitions of the area. Because of this, professor of geography at the University of California, Berkeley Richard Walker claimed that "no other U.S. city-region is as definitionally challenged [as the Bay Area]."

When the region began to rapidly develop during and immediately after World War II, local planners settled on a nine-county definition for the Bay Area, consisting of the counties that directly border the San Francisco, San Pablo, and Suisun estuaries: Alameda, Contra Costa, Marin, Napa, San Francisco, San Mateo, Santa Clara, Solano, and Sonoma counties. Today, this definition is accepted by most local governmental agencies including San Francisco Regional Water Quality Control Board, Bay Area Air Quality Management District, the San Francisco Bay Restoration Authority, the Metropolitan Transportation Commission, and the Association of Bay Area Governments, the latter two of which partner to deliver a Bay Area Census using the nine-county definition.

Various U.S. Federal government agencies use definitions that differ from their local counterparts' nine-county definition. For example, the Federal Communications Commission (FCC) which regulates broadcast, cable, and satellite transmissions, includes nearby Colusa, Lake and Mendocino counties in their "San Francisco-Oakland-San Jose" media market, but excludes eastern Solano county. On the other hand, the United States Office of Management and Budget, which designates metropolitan statistical areas (MSAs) and combined statistical areas (CSA) for populated regions across the country, has five MSAs which include, wholly or partially, areas within the nine-county definition, and one CSA which includes all nine counties plus neighboring San Benito, Santa Cruz, San Joaquin, Merced, and Stanislaus counties.

The Association of Bay Area Health Officers (ABAHO), which is an organization that has fought local outbreaks of AIDS, consists of the public health officers of the nine Bay Area counties plus Santa Cruz, Monterey, and San Benito counties outside of this region and the city of Berkeley.

Subregions
Among locals, the nine-county Bay Area can be further divided into five sub-regions: the East Bay, North Bay, South Bay, Peninsula, and the city of San Francisco. Although geographically located on the tip of the San Francisco Peninsula, the city of San Francisco is not considered part of the "Peninsula" subregion, but as a separate entity.

The "East Bay" is the densest region of the Bay Area outside of San Francisco and includes cities and towns in Alameda and Contra Costa counties centered around Oakland .As one of the larger subregions, the East Bay includes a variety of enclaves, including the suburban Tri-Valley area and the highly urban western part of the subregion that runs alongside the bay, including Oakland. The "Peninsula" subregion includes the cities and towns on the San Francisco Peninsula, excluding the titular city of San Francisco. Its eastern half, which runs alongside the Bay, is highly populated, while its less populated western coast traces the coastline of the Pacific Ocean and is known for its open space and hiking trails. Roughly coinciding with the borders of San Mateo County, it also includes the northwestern Santa Clara County cities of Palo Alto, Mountain View, and Los Altos. The "South Bay" includes all of the rest of the cities in Santa Clara County, centered around San Jose, the largest city in Northern California. It is roughly synonymous with Silicon Valley due to its high concentration of tech companies, although the industry also has a significant presence in the rest of the Bay Area. The "North Bay" includes Marin, Sonoma, Napa, and Solano counties, and is the largest and least populated subregion. The western counties of Marin and Sonoma are encased by the Pacific Ocean on the west and the bay on the east and are characterized by their mountainous and woody terrain. Sonoma and Napa counties are known internationally for their grape vineyards and wineries, and Solano County to the east, centered around Vallejo, is the fastest growing region in the Bay Area.

History

The earliest archaeological evidence of human habitation of the Bay Area dates to around 10,000 B.C. (Coyote Hills Shell Mound) along the shores of the bay, with evidence pointing to even earlier settlement in Point Reyes in Marin County. The Miwokan and Costanoan Ohlone people, who were living in the Bay Area at the time of first European contact, were possibly descended from Siberian tribes who arrived at around 1,000 BC by sailing over the Arctic Ocean and following the salmon migration. The Ohlone lived in about forty or so tribes spread throughout the lands adjacent to the San Francisco Bay and as far south as Point Sur near Monterey Bay.

The first European claim to any of the area occurred in June 1579 when Sir Francis Drake landed at Drakes Bay near Point Reyes. Even though he claimed the region for Queen Elizabeth I as Nova Albion or New Albion the English made no immediate follow up to the claim. In November 1595, a Spanish exploration party led by Sebastião Rodrigues Soromenho also landed at Drakes Bay and claimed the region for Spain's King Philip II as Puerto y Bahía de San Francisco.

The San Francisco Bay itself remained undiscovered by Europeans until members of the Portolá expedition, while trekking along the California coast, encountered it in 1769 when the bay blocked their continued journey north. In 1806, a Spanish expedition led by Gabriel Moraga began at the Presidio, traveled south of the bay, and then east to explore the San Joaquin Valley. In 1821, Mexico gained its independence from Spain and the Bay Area became part of the Mexican province of Alta California, a period characterized by ranch life and visiting American trappers. Mexico's control of the territory would be short-lived, however, and in 1846 a party of settlers occupied Sonoma Plaza and proclaimed the independence of the new Republic of California. That same year, the Mexican–American War began, and American captain John Berrien Montgomery sailed the  into the bay and seized San Francisco, which was then known as Yerba Buena, and raised the American flag for the first time over Portsmouth Square.

In 1848, James W. Marshall's discovery of gold in the American River sparked the California Gold Rush, and within half a year 4,000 men were panning for gold along the river and finding $50,000 per day. The promise of fabulous riches quickly led to a stampede of wealth-seekers descending on Sutter's Mill. The Bay Area's population quickly emptied out as laborers, clerks, waiters, and servants joined the rush to find gold, and California's first newspaper, The Californian, was forced to announce a temporary freeze in new issues due to labor shortages. By the end of 1849, news had spread across the world and newcomers flooded into the Bay Area at a rate of one thousand per week on their way to California's interior, including the first large influx of Chinese immigrants to the U.S. The rush was so great that vessels were abandoned by the hundreds in San Francisco's ports as crews rushed to the goldfields. The unprecedented influx of new arrivals spread the nascent government authorities thin, and the military was unable to prevent desertions. As a result, numerous vigilante groups formed to provide order, but many tasked themselves with forcibly moving or killing local Native Americans, and by the end of the Gold Rush, two thirds of the indigenous population had been killed.

During this same time, a constitutional convention was called to determine California's application for statehood into the United States. After statehood was granted, the capital city moved between three cities in the Bay Area: San Jose (1849–1851), Vallejo (1851–1852), and Benicia (1852–1853) before permanently settling in Sacramento in 1854. As the Gold Rush wound down, wealth generated from the endeavor led to the establishment of Wells Fargo Bank and the Bank of California, and immigrant laborers attracted by the promise of wealth transformed the demographic makeup of the region. Construction of the First transcontinental railroad from the Oakland Long Wharf attracted so many laborers from China that by 1870, eight percent of San Francisco's population was of Asian origin. The completion of the railroad connected the Bay Area with the rest of the United States, established a truly national marketplace for the trade of goods, and accelerated the urbanization of the region.

In the early morning of April 18, 1906, a large earthquake with an epicenter near the city of San Francisco hit the region. Immediate casualty estimates by the U.S. Army's relief operations were 498 deaths in San Francisco, 64 deaths in Santa Rosa, and 102 in or near San Jose, for a total of about 700. More recent studies estimate the total death count to be over 3,000, with over 28,000 buildings destroyed. Rebuilding efforts began immediately. Amadeo Peter Giannini, owner of the Bank of Italy (now known as the Bank of America), had managed to retrieve the money from his bank's vaults before fires broke out through the city and was the only bank with liquid funds readily available and was instrumental in loaning out funds for rebuilding efforts. Congress immediately approved plans for a reservoir in Hetch Hetchy Valley in Yosemite National Park, a plan they had denied a few years earlier, which now provides drinking water for 2.4 million people in the Bay Area. By 1915, the city had been sufficiently rebuilt and advertised itself to the world during the Panama Pacific Exposition that year, although the effects of the quake hastened the loss of the region's dominant status in California to the Los Angeles metropolitan area.

During the 1929 stock market crash and subsequent economic depression, not a single San Francisco-based bank failed, while the region attempted to spur job growth by simultaneously undertaking two large infrastructure projects: construction of the Golden Gate Bridge, which would connect San Francisco with Marin County, and the Bay Bridge, which would connect San Francisco with Oakland and the East Bay. After the United States joined World War II in 1941, the Bay Area became a major domestic military and naval hub, with large shipyards constructed in Sausalito and across the East Bay to build ships for the war effort. The Army's San Francisco Port of Embarkation was the primary origin for Army forces shipping out to the Pacific Theater of Operations. That command consisted of fourteen installations including Fort Mason, the Oakland Army Base, Camp Stoneman and Fort McDowell in San Francisco Bay and the sub port of Los Angeles.

After the war, the United Nations was chartered in San Francisco to help prevent the kind of devastation that occurred over the past decade, and in September 1951, the Treaty of San Francisco to re-establish peaceful relations between Japan and the Allied Powers was signed in San Francisco, entering into force a year later. In the years immediately following the war, the Bay Area saw a huge wave of immigration as populations increased across the region. Between 1950 and 1960, San Francisco welcomed over 100,000 new residents, inland suburbs in the East Bay saw their populations double, Daly City's population quadrupled, and Santa Clara's population quintupled.

By the early 1960s, the Bay Area and the rest of Northern California became the center of the counterculture movement. Telegraph Avenue in Berkeley and the Haight-Ashbury neighborhood in San Francisco were seen as centers of activity, with the hit American pop song San Francisco (Be Sure to Wear Flowers in Your Hair) further enticing like-minded individuals to join the movement in the Bay Area and leading to the Summer of Love. In the proceeding decades, the Bay Area would cement itself as a hotbed of New Left activism, student activism, opposition to the Vietnam War and other anti-war movements, the black power movement, and the gay rights movement. At the same time, San Jose and the rest of the South Bay began to rapidly develop as it began to transition from a largely agricultural-based economy into the hotbed of the high-tech industry. Fred Terman, the director of a top-secret research project at Harvard University during World War II, joined the faculty at Stanford University in order to reshape the university's engineering department. His students, including David Packard and William Hewlett, would later help usher in the region's high-tech revolution. In 1955, Shockley Semiconductor Laboratory opened for business near Stanford, and although the business venture was a financial failure, it was the first semiconductor company in the Bay Area, and the talent that it attracted to the region eventually led to a high-tech cluster of companies later known as Silicon Valley.

In 1989, in the middle of the World Series match between two Bay Area baseball teams, the Loma Prieta earthquake struck and caused widespread infrastructural damage, including the failure of the Bay Bridge, a major link between San Francisco and Oakland. Even so, the Bay Area's technology industry continued to expand and growth in Silicon Valley accelerated that the United States census confirmed that year that San Jose had overtaken San Francisco in terms of population. The commercialization of the Internet in the middle of the decade rapidly created a speculative bubble in the high-tech economy known as the dot-com bubble. This bubble began collapsing in the early 2000s and the industry continued contracting for the next few years, nearly wiping out the market. Companies like Amazon.com and Google managed to weather the crash however, and following the industry's return to normalcy, their market value increased significantly.

Even as the growth of the technology sector transformed the region's economy, progressive politics continued to guide the region's political environment. By the turn of the millennium, non-Hispanic whites, the largest ethnic group in the United States, were only half of the population in the Bay Area as immigration among minority groups accelerated. During this time, the Bay Area was the center of the LGBT rights movement: in 2004, San Francisco began issuing marriage licenses to same-sex couples, a first in the United States, and four years later a majority of voters in the Bay Area rejected California Proposition 8, which sought to constitutionally restrict marriage to opposite-sex couples but ultimately passed statewide. The Bay Area was also the center of contentious protests concerning racial and economic inequality. In 2009, an African-American man named Oscar Grant was fatally shot by Bay Area Rapid Transit police officers, precipitating widespread protests across the region and even riots in Oakland. His name was symbolically tied to the Occupy Oakland protests two years later that sought to fight against social and economic inequality.

Following the Inauguration of Donald Trump as President of the United States in 2017, the Bay Area became a center of resistance to his administration, beginning with widespread protests in concert with the nationwide Women's March a day later, followed by frequent public feuds between Trump and various Bay Area political, cultural, and business figures over issues of race and immigration.

In March 2020, in response to the COVID-19 pandemic, all residents of 6 Bay Area counties were required by local health authorities to stay-at-home orders under a shelter-in-place, the first such order issued in the United States. Residents who were found outside and were not homeless, seeking emergency or health relief, or getting essential products such as food, were committing misdemeanors under to the order. The order was later expanded to cover the entire state of California three days later. In late 2020, protests over the murder of George Floyd took place in the city from May 28 into October.

Geography

Climate

The Bay Area is located in the warm-summer Mediterranean climate zone (Köppen Csb) that is a characteristic of California's coast, featuring mild to cool winters with occasional rainfall, and warm to hot, dry summers. It is largely influenced by the cold California Current, which penetrates the natural mountainous barrier along the coast by traveling through various gaps. In terms of precipitation, this means that the Bay Area has pronounced seasons. The winter season, which roughly runs between November and March, is the source of about 82% of annual precipitation in the area. In the South Bay and further inland, while the winter season is cool and mild, the summer season is characterized by warm sunny days, while in San Francisco and areas closer to the Golden Gate strait, the summer season is periodically affected by fog.

Due to the Bay Area's diverse topography, the result of the clashing tectonic plates, the region is home to numerous microclimates that lead to pronounced differences in climate and temperature over short distances. Within the city of San Francisco, natural and artificial topographical features direct the movement of wind and fog, resulting in startlingly varied climates between city blocks. Along the Golden Gate Strait, oceanic wind and fog from the Pacific Ocean are able to penetrate the mountain barriers inland into the Bay Area. During the summer, rising hot air in California's interior valleys creates a low pressure area that draws winds from the North Pacific High through the Golden Gate, which creates the city's characteristic cool winds and fog. The microclimate phenomenon is most pronounced during this time, when fog penetration is at its maximum in areas near the Golden Gate strait, while the South Bay and areas further inland are sunny and dry.

Along the San Francisco peninsula, gaps in the Santa Cruz Mountains, one south of San Bruno Mountain and another in Crystal Springs, allow oceanic weather into the interior, causing a cooling effect for cities along the Peninsula and even as far south as San Jose. This weather pattern is also the source for delays at San Francisco International Airport. In Marin county north of the Golden Gate strait, two gaps north of Muir Woods bring cold air across the Marin Headlands, with the cooling effect reaching as far north as Santa Rosa. Further inland, the East Bay receives oceanic weather that travels through the Golden Gate strait, and further diffuses that air through the Berkeley Hills, Niles Canyon and the Hayward Pass into the Livermore Valley and Altamont Pass. Here, the resulting breeze is so strong that it is home to one of the world's largest array of wind turbines. Further north, the Carquinez Strait funnels the ocean weather into the San Joaquin River Delta, causing a cooling effect in Stockton and Sacramento, so that these cities are also cooler than their Central Valley counterparts in the south.

Ecology

Marine wildlife

The Bay Area is home to a diverse array of wildlife and, along with the connected San Joaquin River Delta represents one of California's most important ecological habitats. California's Dungeness crab, Pacific halibut, and the California scorpionfish are all significant components of the bay's fisheries. The bay's salt marshes now represent most of California's remaining salt marsh and support a number of endangered species and provide key ecosystem services such as filtering pollutants and sediments from the rivers. Most famously, the bay is a key link in the Pacific Flyway and with millions of shorebirds annually visiting the bay shallows as a refuge, is the most important component of the flyway south of Alaska. Many endangered species of birds are also found here: the California least tern, the California clapper rail, the snowy egret, and the black crowned night heron.

There is also a significant diversity of salmonids present in the bay. Steelhead populations in California have dramatically declined due to human and natural causes; in the Bay Area, all naturally spawned anadromous steelhead populations below natural and manmade impassable barriers in California streams from the Russian River to Aptos Creek, and the drainages of San Francisco, San Pablo, and Suisun Bays are listed as threatened under the Federal Endangered Species Act. The Central California Coast coho salmon population is the most endangered of the many troubled salmon populations on the west coast of the United States, including populations residing in tributaries to the San Francisco Bay. California Coast Chinook salmon were historically native to the Guadalupe River in San Francisco Bay, and Chinook salmon runs persist today in the Guadalupe River, Coyote Creek, Napa River, and Walnut Creek. Industrial, mining, and other uses of mercury have resulted in a widespread distribution of that poisonous metal in the bay, with uptake in the bay's phytoplankton and contamination of its sportfish.

Aquatic mammals are also present in the bay. Before 1825, Spanish, French, English, Russians and Americans were drawn to the Bay Area to harvest prodigious quantities of beaver, river otter, marten, fisher, mink, fox, weasel, harbor and fur seals and sea otter. This early fur trade, known as the California Fur Rush, was more than any other single factor, responsible for opening up the West and the San Francisco Bay Area, in particular, to world trade. By 1817 sea otter in the area were practically eliminated. Since then, the California golden beaver re-established a presence in Alhambra Creek, followed by the Napa River and Sonoma Creek in the north Bay, and the Guadalupe River and Coyote Creek in the south Bay. The North American river otter which was first reported in Redwood Creek at Muir Beach in 1996, has since been spotted in the North Bay's Corte Madera Creek, the South Bay's Coyote Creek, as well as in 2010 in San Francisco Bay itself at the Richmond Marina. Other mammals include the internationally famous sea lions who began inhabiting San Francisco's Pier 39 after the 1989 Loma Prieta earthquake and the locally famous Humphrey the Whale, a humpback whale who entered San Francisco Bay twice on errant migrations in the late 1980s and early 1990s. Bottlenose dolphins and harbor porpoises have recently returned to the bay, having been absent for many decades. Historically, this was the northern extent of their warm-water species range.

Birds

In addition to the many species of marine birds that can be seen in the Bay Area, many other species of birds make the Bay Area their home, making the region a popular destination for birdwatching. Many birds, including many described in the following paragraphs, are listed as endangered species despite once being common in the region, due to human and other factors.

Western burrowing owls were originally listed as a species of special concern by the California Department of Fish and Game in 1979. California's population declined 60% from the 1980s to the early 1990s, and continues to decline at roughly 8% per year. A 1992–93 survey reported little to no breeding burrowing owls in most of the western counties in the Bay Area, leaving only Alameda, Contra Costa, and Solano counties as remnants of a once large breeding range. Bald eagles were once common in the Bay Area, but habitat destruction and thinning of eggs from DDT poisoning reduced the California state population to 35 nesting pairs. Bald eagles disappeared from the Bay Area in 1915, and only began returning in recent years. In the 1980s an effort to re-introduce the species to the area began with the Santa Cruz Predatory Bird Research Group and the San Francisco Zoo importing birds and eggs from Vancouver Island and northeastern California, and there are now nineteen nesting couples in eight of the Bay Area's nine counties. Other once absent species that have returned to the Bay Area include Swainson’s hawk, white tailed kite, and the osprey.

In 1927, zoologist Joseph Grinnell wrote that osprey were only rare visitors to the San Francisco Bay Area, although he noted records of one or two used nests in the broken tops of redwood trees along the Russian River. In 1989, the southern breeding range of the osprey in the Bay Area was Kent Lake, although osprey were noted to be extending their range further south in the Central Valley and the Sierra Nevada. In 2014, a Bay Area-wide survey found osprey had extended their breeding range southward with nesting sites as far south as Hunters Point in San Francisco on the west side and Hayward on the east side, while further studies have found nesting sites as far south as the Los Gatos Creek watershed, indicating that the nesting range now includes the entire length of San Francisco Bay. Most nests were built on man-made structures close to areas of human disturbance, likely due to lack of mature trees near the Bay. The wild turkey population was introduced in the 1960s by state game officials, and by 2015 have become a common sight in East Bay communities.

Geology and landforms

The Bay Area is well known for the complexity of its landforms that are the result of the forces of plate tectonics acting over of millions of years, since the region is located in the middle of a meeting point between two plates. Nine out of eleven distinct assemblages have been identified in a single county, Alameda. Diverse assemblages adjoin in complex arrangements due to offsets along the many faults (both active and stable) in the area. As a consequence, many types of rock and soil are found in the region. The oldest rocks are metamorphic rocks that are associated with granite in the Salinian Block west of the San Andreas fault. These were formed from sedimentary rocks of sandstone, limestone, and shale in uplifted seabeds. Volcanic deposits also exist in the Bay Area, left behind by the movement of the San Andreas fault, whose movement sliced a subduction plate and allowed magma to briefly flow to the surface.

The region has considerable vertical relief in its landscapes that are not in the alluvial plains leading to the bay or in inland valleys. The topography, and geologic history, of the Bay Area can largely be attributed to the compressive forces between the Pacific Plate and the North American plate. The three major ridge structures in the Bay Area, part of the Pacific Coast Range, are all roughly parallel to the major faults. The Santa Cruz Mountains along the San Francisco Peninsula and the Marin Hills in Marin County follow the San Andreas fault, The Berkeley Hills, San Leandro Hills and their southern ridgeline extension through Mission Peak roughly follow the Hayward fault, and the Diablo Range, which includes Mount Diablo and Mount Hamilton and runs along the Calaveras fault.

In total, the Bay Area is traversed by seven major fault systems with hundreds of related faults, all of which are stressed by the relative motion between the Pacific Plate and the North American Plate or by compressive stresses between these plates. The fault systems include the Hayward Fault Zone, Concord-Green Valley Fault, Calaveras Fault, Clayton-Marsh Creek-Greenville Fault, Rodgers Creek Fault, and the San Gregorio Fault. Significant blind thrust faults (faults with near vertical motion and no surface ruptures) are associated with portions of the Santa Cruz Mountains and the northern reaches of the Diablo Range and Mount Diablo. These "hidden" faults, which are not as well known, pose a significant earthquake hazard. Among the more well-understood faults, as of 2014, scientists estimate a 72% probability of a magnitude 6.7 earthquake occurring along either the Hayward, Rogers Creek, or San Andreas fault, with an earthquake more likely to occur in the East Bay's Hayward Fault. Two of the largest earthquakes in recent history were the 1906 San Francisco earthquake and the 1989 Loma Prieta earthquake.

Hydrography

The Bay Area is home to a complex network of watersheds, marshes, rivers, creeks, reservoirs, and bays that predominantly drain into the San Francisco Bay and Pacific Ocean. The largest bodies of water in the Bay Area are the San Francisco, San Pablo, and Suisun estuaries. Major rivers of the North Bay include the Napa River, the Petaluma River, the Gualala River, and the Russian River; the former two drain into San Pablo Bay, the latter two into the Pacific Ocean. In the South Bay, the Guadalupe River drains into San Francisco Bay near Alviso. There are also several lakes present in the Bay Area, including man-made lakes like Lake Berryessa and natural albeit heavily modified lakes like Lake Merritt.

Prior to the introduction of European agricultural methods, the shores of San Francisco Bay consisted mostly of tidal marshes. Today, the bay has been significantly altered heavily re-engineered to accommodate the needs of water delivery, shipping, agriculture, and urban development, with side effects including the loss of wetlands and the introduction of contaminants and invasive species. Approximately 85% of those marshes have been lost or destroyed, but about 50 marshes and marsh fragments remain. Huge tracts of the marshes were originally destroyed by farmers for agricultural purposes, then repurposed to serve as salt evaporation ponds to produce salt for food and other purposes. Today, regulations limit the destruction of tidal marshes, and large portions are currently being rehabilitated to their natural state.

Over time, droughts and wildfires have increased in frequency and become less seasonal and more year-round, further straining the region's water security.

Demographics

According to the 2010 United States Census, the population of the nine-county Bay Area was 7.15 million, with 49.6% male and 50.4% female. Of these, approximately 2.3 million (32%) are foreign born. In 2010 the racial makeup of the nine-county Bay Area was 52.5% White (42.4% were non-Hispanic and 10.1% were Hispanic), 23.3% Asian, 6.7% non-Hispanic Black or African American, 0.7% Native American or Alaska Native, 0.6% Pacific Islander, 5.4% from two or more races and 10.8% from other races. Hispanic or Latino residents of any race formed 23.5% of the population.

The Bay Area cities of Vallejo, Suisun City, Oakland, San Leandro, Fairfield, and Richmond are among the most ethnically diverse cities in the United States.

Non-Hispanic whites form majorities of the population in Marin, Napa, and Sonoma counties. Whites also make up the majority in the eastern regions of the East Bay centered around the Lamorinda and Tri-Valley areas. San Francisco's North Beach district is considered the Little Italy of the city, and was once home to a significant Italian-American community. San Francisco, Marin County and the Lamorinda area all have substantial Jewish communities.

The Latino population is spread throughout the Bay Area, but among the nine counties, the greatest number live in Santa Clara County, while Contra Costa County sees the highest growth rate. The largest Hispanic or Latino groups were those of Mexican (17.9%), Salvadoran (1.3%), Guatemalan (0.6%), Puerto Rican (0.6%) and Nicaraguans (0.5%) ancestry. Mexican Americans make up the largest share of Hispanic residents in Napa county, while Central Americans make up the largest share in San Francisco, many of whom live in the Mission District which is home to many residents of Salvadoran and Guatemalan descent.

The Asian-American population in the Bay Area is one of the largest in the United States. Asian-Americans make up the plurality in two major counties in the Bay Area: Santa Clara County and Alameda County. The largest Asian-American groups were those of Chinese (7.9%), Filipino (5.1%), Indian (3.3%), Vietnamese (2.5%), and Japanese (0.9%) heritage. Daly City has the highest proportion of Asian-American residents (58.4%) in a large U.S. city outside of Hawaii. Asian Americans also constitute a majority in Cupertino, Fremont, Milpitas, Union City and significant populations in Dublin, Foster City, Hercules, Millbrae, San Ramon, Saratoga, Sunnyvale and Santa Clara. The cities of San Jose and San Francisco had the third and fourth most Asian-American residents in the United States. In San Francisco, Chinese Americans constitute 21.4% of the population and constitute the single largest ethnic group in the city. The Bay Area is home to over 382,950 Filipino Americans, one of the largest communities of Filipino people outside of the Philippines with the largest proportion of Filipino Americans concentrating themselves within American Canyon, Daly City, Fairfield, Hercules, South San Francisco, Union City and Vallejo. Santa Clara county, and increasingly the East Bay, house a significant Indian American community. There are more than 100,000 people of Vietnamese ancestry residing within San Jose city limits, the largest Vietnamese population of any city in the world outside of Vietnam. In addition, there is a sizable community of Korean Americans in Santa Clara county, where San Jose is located. East Bay cities such as Richmond and Oakland, and the North Bay city of Santa Rosa, have plentiful populations of Laotian and Cambodians in certain neighborhoods.

Pacific Islanders such as Samoans and Tongans have the largest presence in East Palo Alto, where they constitute over 7% of the population.

The African-American population of San Francisco was formerly substantial, had a thriving jazz scene and was known as "Harlem of the West." While black residents formed one-seventh of the city's population in 1970, today they have mostly moved to parts of the East Bay and North Bay, including Antioch, Fairfield and out of the Bay Area entirely. The South Park neighborhood of Santa Rosa was once home to a primarily black community until the 1980s, when many Latino immigrants settled in the area. Other cities with large numbers of African Americans include Vallejo (28%), Richmond (26%), East Palo Alto (17%) and the CDP of Marin City (38%).

Since the economy of the Bay Area heavily relies on innovation and high-tech skills, a greater, educated population exists in the region. Roughly 87.4% of Bay Area residents have attained a high school degree or higher, while 46% of adults in the Bay Area have earned a post-secondary degree or higher.

The Bay Area is the wealthiest region in the United States, due, primarily, to the economic power engines of San Jose, San Francisco, and Oakland. The Bay Area city of Pleasanton has the second-highest household income in the country after New Canaan, Connecticut. However, discretionary income is very comparable with the rest of the country, primarily because the higher cost of living offsets the increased income.

By 2014, the Bay Area's wealth gap was considerable: the top ten percent of income-earners took home over eleven times as much as the bottom ten percent, and a Brookings Institution study found the San Francisco metro area, which excludes four Bay Area counties, to be the third most unequal urban area in the country. Among the wealthy, forty-seven Bay Area residents made the Forbes magazine's 400 richest Americans list, published in 2007. Thirteen lived in San Francisco proper, placing it seventh among cities in the world. Among the forty-seven were several well-known names such as Steve Jobs, George Lucas, and Charles Schwab. The wealthiest resident was Larry Ellison of Oracle, worth $25 billion. A study by Capgemini indicates that in 2009, 4.5 percent of all households within the San Francisco-Oakland and San Jose metropolitan areas held $1 million in investable assets, placing the region first in the United States, just ahead of the New York City metro region. On the other hand, low income residents in the Bay Area saw their incomes fall by nine percent since 2007, with the bottom ten percent earning just $20,000 on average.

Crime
Statistics regarding crime rates in the Bay Area generally fall into two categories: violent crime and property crime. Historically, violent crime has been concentrated in a few cities in the East Bay, namely Oakland, Richmond, and Antioch, but also East Palo Alto in the Peninsula, Vallejo in the North Bay, and San Francisco. Nationally, Oakland's murder rate ranked 18th among cities with over 100,000 residents, and third for violent crimes per capita. According to a 2015 Federal Bureau of Investigation report, Oakland was also the source of the most violent crime in the Bay Area, with 16.9 reported incidents per thousand people. Vallejo came in second, at 8.7 incidents per thousand people, while San Pablo, Antioch, and San Francisco rounded out the top five. East Palo Alto, which used to have the Bay Area's highest murder rate, saw violent crime incidents drop 65% between 2013 and 2014, while Oakland saw violent crime incidents drop 15%. Meanwhile, San Jose, which was one of the safest large cities in the United States in the early 2000s, has seen its violent crime rates trend upwards. Cities with the lowest rate of violent crime include the Peninsula cities of Los Altos and Foster City, East Bay cities of San Ramon and Danville, and South Bay cities of Saratoga and Cupertino. In 2015, 45 Bay Area cities counted zero homicides, the largest of which was Daly City.

In 2015, Oakland also saw the highest rates of property crime in the Bay Area, at 59.4 incidents per thousand residents, with San Francisco following close behind at 53 incidents per thousand residents. The East Bay cities Pleasant Hill, Berkeley, and San Leandro rounded out the top five. The South Bay city of Saratoga and the North Bay city of Windsor saw the least rates of property crime. Additionally, San Francisco saw the most reports of arson.

Several street gangs operate in the Bay Area, including the Sureños and Norteños in San Francisco's Mission District. African-American street gangs familiar in other cities, including the Crips, have struggled to establish footholds in the city, although gangs with shotcallers in China, including Triad groups such as the Wo Hop To, have been reported active. In 1977, an ongoing rivalry between two Chinese gangs led to a shooting attack at the Golden Dragon restaurant in Chinatown, which left five people dead and eleven wounded. Five members of the Joe Boys gang were arrested and convicted of the crime. Oakland, which also sees organized gang violence, implemented Operation Ceasefire in 2012 in an effort to reduce the violence.

Economy

The three principal cities of the Bay Area represent different employment clusters and are dominated by different, but commingled, industries. San Francisco is home to the region's financial industry, tourism, and is host to numerous conventions. The East Bay, centered around Oakland, is home to heavy industry, metalworking, oil, and shipping, while San Jose is the heart of Silicon Valley where a major pole of economic activity around the technology industry resides. Furthermore, the North Bay is a major player in the country's agriculture and wine industry. In all, the Bay Area is home to the second highest concentration of Fortune 500 companies, second only to the New York metropolitan area, with thirty such companies based throughout the region. In 2019, the greater fourteen-county statistical area had a GDP of $1.086 trillion, the third-highest among combined statistical areas. The smaller nine-county Bay Area had a GDP of $995 billion in the same year, which nonetheless would rank it fifth among U.S. states and 17th among countries.

Several major corporations are headquartered in the Bay Area. Among the Fortune 500 companies located in the region include technology companies Google, Facebook, Apple Inc., Hewlett Packard, Intel, Adobe Inc., Applied Materials, eBay, Cisco Systems, Symantec, Netflix, Sony Interactive Entertainment, Electronic Arts, and Salesforce; energy companies Chevron and PG&E; financial service companies Visa Inc. and Wells Fargo; apparel retailers Gap Inc., Levi Strauss & Co., and Ross Stores; aerospace and defense contractor Lockheed Martin; local grocer Safeway; and biotechnology companies Genentech and Gilead Sciences. The largest manufacturers include Tesla Inc., Lam Research, Bayer, Chevron, and Coca-Cola. The Port of Oakland is the fifth-largest container shipping port in the United States, and Oakland is also a major rail terminus. In research, NASA's Ames Research Center and the federal research facility Lawrence Livermore National Laboratory are based in Mountain View and Livermore respectively. In the North Bay, Napa and Sonoma counties are known for their famous wineries, including Fantesca Estate & Winery, Domaine Chandon California, and D'Agostini Winery.

Despite the San Francisco Bay Area's booming industries contributing to the aforementioned economic growth, there is a significant level of poverty in the region. Rising housing prices and gentrification in the San Francisco Bay Area are often framed as symptomatic of high-income tech workers moving in to previously low-income, underserved neighborhoods. As of June 2014, median rent in San Francisco increased to $2,300, a 21% in one year. In Oakland, median rent increased by one-third between 2011 and 2013. Two notable policy strategies to prevent eviction due to rising rents include rent control and subsidies such as Section 8 and Shelter Plus Care. Moreover, in 2002, then San Francisco Supervisor Gavin Newsom introduced the "Care Not Cash" initiative, diverting funds away from cash handouts (which he argued encouraged drug use) to housing. This proved controversial, with some suggesting his rhetoric criminalized poverty, while others supporting the prioritizing of housing as a solution. To this day, the effectiveness of Care Not Cash continues to be debated.

Contrary to historical patterns of low incomes within the inner city, poverty rates in the Bay Area are shifting such that they are increasing more rapidly in suburban areas than in urban areas. It is not yet clear whether the suburbanization of poverty is due to the relocation of poor populations or shifting income levels in the respective regions. However, the mid-2000s housing boom encouraged city dwellers to move into the newly cheap houses in suburbs outside of the city, and these suburban housing developments were then most affected by the 2008 housing bubble burst. As such, people in poverty experience decreased access to transportation due to underdeveloped public transport infrastructure in suburban areas. Suburban poverty is most prevalent among Hispanics and Blacks, and affects native-born people more significantly than foreign-born.

As greater proportions of incomes are spent on rent, many impoverished populations in the San Francisco Bay Area also face food insecurity and health setbacks.

Housing
The Bay Area is the most expensive place to live in the United States. Strong economic growth has created hundreds of thousands of new jobs, but coupled with severe restrictions on building new housing units, has resulted in an extreme housing shortage. For example, from 2012 to 2017, the San Francisco metropolitan area added 400,000 new jobs, but only 60,000 new housing units. As of 2016, the entire Bay Area had 3.6 M jobs, and 2.6 M housing units, for a ratio of 1.4 jobs per housing unit, significantly above the ratio for the US as a whole, which stands at 1.1 jobs per housing unit. (152M jobs, 136M housing units) According to a survey conducted by the United States Census Bureau, the Bay Area ranks #1 "in median home value, median monthly costs for homes with a mortgage, and median gross rent." As of 2017, the average income needed in order to purchase a house in the region was $179,390, while the median price for a house was $895,000 and the average cost of a home in the Bay Area being $440,000 - more than twice the national average, while the average monthly rent is $1,240 - 50 percent more than the national average. In 2018, a Bay Area household income of $117,000 was classified as "low income" by the Department of Housing and Urban Development.

With high costs of living, many Bay Area residents allocate large amounts of their income towards housing. 20 percent of Bay Area homeowners spend more than half their income on housing, while roughly 25 percent of renters in the Bay Area spend more than half of their incomes on rent. Expending an average of more than $28,000 per year on housing in addition to roughly $13,400 on transportation, Bay Area residents spend around $41,420 per year to live in the region. This combined total of housing and transportation signifies 59 percent of the Bay Area's median household income, conveying the extreme costs of living. The high rate of homelessness in the Bay Area can be attributed to the high cost of living. No approximate number of homeless people living in the Bay Area can be determined due to the difficulty of tracking homeless residents. However, according to San Francisco’s Department of Public Health, the number of homeless people in San Francisco alone is 9,975. Additionally, San Francisco was revealed to have the most unsheltered homeless people in the country.

Because of the high cost of housing, many workers in the Bay Area live far from their place of employment, contributing to one of the highest percentages of extreme commuters in the United States, or commutes that take over ninety minutes in one direction. For example, about 50,000 people commute from neighboring San Joaquin county into the nine-county Bay Area daily, and more extremely, some workers commute semimonthly by flying.

Education

Colleges and universities

The Bay Area is home to a large number of colleges and universities.  The first institution of higher education in the Bay Area, Santa Clara University, was founded by Jesuits in 1851, who also founded the University of San Francisco in 1855. San Jose State University was founded in 1857 and is the oldest public college on the West Coast of the United States. According to the Brookings Institution, 45% of residents of the two-county San Jose metro area have a college degree and 43% of residents in the five-county San Francisco metro area have a college degree, the second and fourth highest ranked metro areas in the country for higher educational attainment.

Rankings compiled by U.S. News & World Report feature several Bay Area universities in prominent spots. Stanford University is the highest ranked university in the Bay Area, and seventh overall in the United States. The University of California, Berkeley is ranked twentieth overall, but for the past nineteen years has been highest-ranked public university in the country. Additionally, San Jose State University and Sonoma State University were respectively ranked sixth and tenth among public colleges in the West Coast.

The city of San Francisco is host to two additional University of California schools, neither of which confer undergraduate degrees. The University of California, San Francisco is entirely dedicated to graduate education in health and biomedical sciences. It is ranked among the top five medical schools in the United States and operates the UCSF Medical Center, which is the highest-ranked hospital in California. The University of California, College of the Law, founded in Civic Center in 1878, is the oldest law school in California and claims more judges on the state bench than any other institution. The city is also host to a California State University school, San Francisco State University. Additional campuses of the California State University system in the Bay Area are Cal State East Bay in Hayward and Cal Maritime in Vallejo.

California Community Colleges System also operates a number of community colleges in the Bay Area. According to CNNMoney, the Bay Area community college with the highest "success" rate is De Anza College in Cupertino, which is also the tenth-highest ranked in the nation. Other relatively well-ranked Bay Area community colleges include Foothill College, City College of San Francisco, West Valley College, Diablo Valley College, and Las Positas College.

Many scholars have pointed out the overlap of education and the economy within the Bay Area. According to multiple reports, research universities such as Stanford University, University of California - Santa Cruz and University of California - Berkeley, are essential to the culture and economy in the area. These universities also provide countless, public programs for people to learn and enhance skills relevant to the local economies. These opportunities not only provide educational services to the community, but also generate significant amounts of revenue.

Primary and secondary schools

Public primary and secondary education in the Bay Area is provided through school districts organized through three structures (elementary school districts, high school districts, or unified school districts) and are governed by an elected board. In addition, many Bay Area counties and the city of San Francisco operate "special service schools" that are geared towards providing education to students with handicaps or special needs. An alternative public educational setting is offered by charter schools, which may be established with a renewable charter of up to five years by third parties. The mechanism for charter schools in the Bay Area is governed by the California Charter Schools Act of 1992.

According to rankings compiled by U.S. News & World Report, the highest-ranked high school in California is the Pacific Collegiate School, located in Santa Cruz and part of the greater Bay Area. Within the traditional nine-county boundaries, the highest ranked high school is KIPP San Jose Collegiate in San Jose. Among the top twenty high schools in California include Lowell High School in San Francisco, Monta Vista High School in Cupertino, Lynbrook High School in San Jose, the University Preparatory Academy in San Jose, Mission San Jose High School in Fremont, Oakland Charter High School in Oakland, Henry M. Gunn High School in Palo Alto, and Saratoga High School in Saratoga.

Transportation

Transportation in the San Francisco Bay Area is reliant on a complex multimodal infrastructure consisting of roads, bridges, highways, rail, tunnels, airports, ferries, and bike and pedestrian paths. The development, maintenance, and operation of these different modes of transportation are overseen by various agencies, including the California Department of Transportation (Caltrans), San Francisco Municipal Transportation Agency, and the Metropolitan Transportation Commission. These and other organizations collectively manage several interstate highways and state routes, two subway networks, three commuter rail agencies, eight trans-bay bridges, transbay ferry service, local bus service, three international airports (San Francisco, San Jose, and Oakland), and an extensive network of roads, tunnels, and paths such as the San Francisco Bay Trail.

The Bay Area hosts an extensive freeway and highway system that is particularly prone to traffic congestion, with one study by Inrix concluding that the Bay Area's traffic was the fourth worst in the world. There are some city streets in San Francisco where gaps occur in the freeway system, partly the result of the Freeway Revolt, which prevented a freeway-only thoroughfare through San Francisco between the San Francisco–Oakland Bay Bridge, the western terminus of Interstate 80, and the southern terminus of the Golden Gate Bridge (U.S. Route 101). Additional damage that occurred in the wake of the 1989 Loma Prieta earthquake resulted in freeway segments being removed instead of being reinforced or rebuilt, leading to the revitalization of neighborhoods such as San Francisco's Embarcadero and Hayes Valley. The greater Bay Area contains the three principal north–south highways in California: Interstate 5, U.S. Route 101, and California State Route 1. U.S. 101 and State Route 1 directly serve the traditional nine-county region, while Interstate 5 bypasses to the east in San Joaquin County to provide a more direct Los Angeles–Sacramento route. Additional local highways connect the various subregions of the Bay Area together.

There are over two dozen public transit agencies in the Bay Area with overlapping service areas that utilize different modes, with designated connection points between the various operators. Bay Area Rapid Transit (BART), a heavy rail/metro system, operates in five counties and connects San Francisco and Oakland via the Transbay Tube. Other commuter rail systems link San Francisco with the Peninsula and San Jose (Caltrain), San Jose with the Tri-Valley Area and San Joaquin County (ACE), and Sonoma with Marin County (SMART). In addition, Amtrak provides frequent commuter service between San Jose and the East Bay with Sacramento, and long-distance service to other parts of the United States. Muni Metro operates a hybrid streetcar/subway system within the city of San Francisco, and VTA operates a light rail system in Santa Clara County. These rail systems are supplemented by numerous bus agencies and transbay ferries such as Golden Gate Ferry and the San Francisco Bay Ferry. Most of these agencies accept the Clipper Card, a reloadable contactless smart card, as a universal electronic payment system.

Government and politics

Government in the San Francisco Bay Area consists of multiple actors, including 101 city and nine county governments, a dozen regional agencies, and a large number of single-purpose special districts such as municipal utility districts and transit districts. Incorporated cities are responsible for providing police service, zoning, issuing building permits, and maintaining public streets among other duties. County governments are responsible for elections and voter registration, vital records, property assessment and records, tax collection, public health, agricultural regulations, and building inspections, among other duties. Public education is provided by independent school districts, which may be organized as elementary districts, high school districts, unified school districts combining elementary and high school grades, or community college districts, and are managed by an elected school board. A variety of special districts also exist and provide a single purpose, such as delivering public transit in the case of the Bay Area Rapid Transit District, or monitoring air quality levels in the case of the Bay Area Air Quality Management District.

Politics in the Bay Area is widely regarded as one of the most liberal in California and in the United States. Since the late 1960s, the Bay Area has cemented its role as the most liberal region in California politics, giving greater support for the center-left Democratic Party's candidates than any other region of the state, even as California trended towards the Democratic Party over time. According to research by the Public Policy Institute of California, the Bay Area and the North Coast counties of Humboldt and Mendocino were the most consistently and strongly liberal areas in California.

According to the California Secretary of State, the Democratic Party holds a voter registration advantage in every congressional district, State Senate district, State Assembly district, State Board of Equalization district, all nine counties, and all of the 101 incorporated municipalities in the Bay Area. On the other hand, the center-right Republican Party holds a voter registration advantage in only one State Assembly sub-district (the portion of the 4th in Solano County). According to the Cook Partisan Voting Index (CPVI), congressional districts the Bay Area tends to favor Democratic candidates by roughly 40 to 50 percentage points, considerably above the mean for California and the nation overall.

In U.S. Presidential elections since 1960, the nine-county Bay Area voted for Republican candidates only two times, in both cases voting for a Californian: in 1972 for Richard Nixon and again in 1980 for Ronald Reagan. The last county to vote for a Republican presidential candidate was Napa county in 1988 for George H. W. Bush. Since then, all nine Bay Area counties have voted consistently for the Democratic candidate. Currently, both of California's U.S. Senators are Democrats, and all twelve U.S. congressional districts located wholly or partially in the Bay Area are represented by a Democratic representative. Additionally, every Bay Area member of the California State Senate and the California State Assembly is a registered Democrat.

The association between the Bay Area and progressive politics has led to the term "San Francisco values" being used by conservative commentators in a pejorative sense to describe the secular progressive culture in the area.

Culture

Arts

Art

The Bay Area was a hub of the Abstract Expressionism movement of painting. It is associated with the works of Clyfford Still, who began teaching at the California School of Fine Arts (now the San Francisco Art Institute) in 1946, leaving a lasting influence on the artistic styles of Bay Area painters up to the present day. A few years later, Abstract Expressionist painter David Park painted Kids on Bikes in 1950, which retained many aspects of abstract expressionism but with original distinguishing features that would later lead to the Bay Area Figurative Movement. While both the Figurative Movement and the Abstract Expressionism movement arose from art schools, Funk art would later rise out of the region's underground and was characterized by informal sharing of technique among groups of friends and art showcases in "cooperative" galleries instead of formal museums. Later, the Bay Area art movement would be heavily influenced by the counterculture movement in the 1960s, and art produced during this time reflected the political environment.

The San Francisco Renaissance was an era of poetic activity centered on San Francisco and poets such as Gary Snyder, Allen Ginsberg, Lawrence Ferlinghetti, which brought it to prominence as a hub of the American poetry avant-garde in the 1950s. The movement, which often included visual and performing arts, was heavily influenced by cross-cultural interests, particularly Buddhism, Taoism, and a general interest in East Asian cultures.

The Bay Area is presently home to a thriving computer animation industry led by Pixar Animation Studios and Industrial Light & Magic. Pixar, based in Emeryville, produced the first fully computer animated feature film, Toy Story, with software it designed in-house and whose computer animation films have since garnered 26 Academy Awards and critical acclaim. Industrial Light & Magic, which is based in the Presidio in San Francisco, was created in 1975 to help create visual effects for the Star Wars series has since been involved with creating visual effects for over three hundred Hollywood films.

Music

Throughout its recent history, the Bay Area has been home to several musical movements that left lasting influences on the genres they affected. San Francisco, in particular, was the center of the counterculture movement in the 1960s, which directly led to the rise of several notable musical acts: The Grateful Dead, which formed in 1965, and Jefferson Airplane and Janis Joplin; all three would be closely associated with the 1967 Summer of Love. Jimi Hendrix also had strong connections to the movement and the Bay Area, as he lived in Berkeley for a brief time as a child and played in many local venues in that decade. By the 1970s, San Francisco had developed a vibrant jazz scene, earning the moniker, "Harlem of the West". The Vietnam War was being fought at the time, and Bay Area bands such as Creedence Clearwater Revival of El Cerrito became known for their political and socially-conscious lyrics against the conflict. Carlos Santana rose to fame in the early 1970s with his Santana band and would later be inducted into the Rock and Roll Hall of Fame. Two former members of Santana, Neal Schon and Gregg Rolie would later lead the formation of the band Journey.

During the 1980s and early 1990s, the Bay Area became home to one of the largest and most influential thrash metal scenes in the world, with contributions from 3 of the "Big Four" of thrash metal, namely Metallica, Slayer, and Megadeth, and the emergence of the avant-garde metal with bands such as Giant Squid, Grayceon, and Ludicra. The post-grunge era in the 1990s featured prominent Bay Area bands Third Eye Blind of San Francisco, Counting Crows of Berkeley, and Smash Mouth of San Jose, and later pop punk rock bands like Green Day. The 1990s also saw the emergence of the influential hyphy movement in hip hop, derived from the Oakland slang for "hyperactive", and pioneered by Bay Area rappers Andre "Mac Dre" Hicks, Mistah Fab, and E-40. Other notable rappers from the Bay Area include Lil B, Tupac Shakur, MC Hammer, Too $hort, and G-Eazy. Today, much of the rap coming out of Oakland and the East Bay is "conscious rap", which concerns itself with social issues and awareness.

The Bay Area is also home to hundreds of classical music ensembles, from community choirs to professional orchestras, such as the San Francisco Symphony, California Symphony, Fremont Symphony Orchestra, Oakland Symphony and the San Francisco Chamber Orchestra.

Theater

According to the regional theater service organization Theatre Bay Area, the San Francisco Bay Area is the third largest center of activity for theater companies and actors in the United States, after the New York City and Chicago metropolitan areas, with 400 companies spread throughout the region. The organization was founded in 1976 by the Magic Theatre and American Conservatory Theater (ACT) in San Francisco and the Berkeley Repertory Theatre in Berkeley. The latter two, along with the San Francisco Mime Troupe and Palo Alto-based Theatreworks, have since gone on to win one Regional Theatre Tony Award each. Several famous actors have arisen from the Bay Area's theatre community, including Daveed Diggs from Hamilton and Darren Criss from Hedwig, A Very Potter Musical, and Glee. Locally, well-regarded actors include James Carpenter, a stage actor who has performed at the ACT, Berkeley Repertory, and San Jose Repertory Theatre among others, Rod Gnapp of the Magic Theatre Company, Sean San Jose, one of the founders of the Campo Santo theater, and Campo Santo member Margo Hall.

The Bay Area also has an active youth theater scene. ACT and the Berkeley Repertory both run classes and camps for young actors, as do the Peninsula Youth Theater and Willow Glen Children’s Theatre in the Peninsula and South Bay, Bay Area Children's Theater and Danville Children’s Musical Theater in the East Bay, and Marin Shakespeare in the North Bay, among many others.

Media

The San Francisco Bay Area is the sixth-largest television market and the fourth-largest radio market in the U.S. The Bay Area's oldest radio station, KCBS (AM), began as an experimental station in San Jose in 1909, before the beginning of commercial broadcasting. KALW was the Bay Area's first FM radio station, and first radio station to begin commercial broadcasting west of the Mississippi River when it signed on the air in 1941. KPIX, which began broadcasting in 1948, was the first television station to air in the Bay Area and Northern California.

All major U.S. television networks have affiliates serving the region, including KTVU 2 (FOX), KRON-TV 4 (Local News/MyNetwork), KPIX 5 (CBS), KGO-TV 7 (ABC), KQED-TV 9 (PBS), KNTV 11 (NBC), KBCW 44/45 (CW), KQEH 54 (PBS), and KKPX 65 (Ion). Bloomberg West, a show that focuses on topics pertaining to technology and business, was launched in 2011 from a studio in and continues to broadcast from San Francisco.

Public broadcasting outlets include both a television station and a radio station, both broadcasting under the call letters KQED from a facility near the Potrero Hill neighborhood. KQED-FM is the most-listened-to National Public Radio affiliate in the country. Another local broadcaster, KPOO, is an independent, African-American owned and operated noncommercial radio station established in 1971.

The largest newspapers in the Bay Area are the San Francisco Chronicle and San Jose Mercury News, the highest and second-highest most widely circulated newspaper in Northern California. The Chronicle is most famous for a former columnist, the late Herb Caen, whose daily musings attracted critical acclaim and represented the "voice of San Francisco". The San Francisco Examiner, once the cornerstone of William Randolph Hearst's media empire and the home of Ambrose Bierce, declined in circulation over the years and now takes the form of a free daily tabloid, under new ownership. Most of the Bay Area's local regions and municipalities also have their own newspapers, such as the East Bay Times and San Mateo Daily Journal. The national newsmagazine Mother Jones is also based in San Francisco. Non-English-language newspapers include several Chinese-language papers such as Sing Tao Daily, the largest in the Bay Area by circulation, and El Mundo, a free Spanish-language weekly distributed by the Mercury News.

Sports and recreation

The Bay Area is home to six professional major league sports franchises: The San Francisco 49ers of the National Football League (NFL) in American football, the San Francisco Giants and Oakland Athletics of Major League Baseball (MLB), the Golden State Warriors of the National Basketball Association (NBA), the San Jose Sharks of the National Hockey League (NHL), and the San Jose Earthquakes of Major League Soccer (MLS).

In football, the 49ers play in Levi's Stadium and have won five Super Bowls (XVI, XIX, XXIII, XXIV, XXIX) and lost two (XLVII and LIV).

In baseball, the Giants, who play at Oracle Park, have won eight World Series titles, three since relocating to San Francisco (2010, 2012, and 2014) from New York in 1958. The Athletics, who play at the Oakland Coliseum, have won nine World Series titles, four since relocating to Oakland (1972, 1973, 1974, and 1989) from Kansas City in 1968.

In basketball, the Warriors play at the Chase Center and have won seven NBA Finals, five since relocating to the Bay Area (1975, 2015, 2017, 2018 and 2022) from Philadelphia in 1962.

In hockey, the Sharks play at the SAP Center. They made their first Stanley Cup Finals appearance in 2016 but have not won the Stanley Cup.

In soccer, the Earthquakes play at PayPal Park and have won the MLS Cup twice in 2001 and 2003. The Bay Area hosted matches during the 1994 FIFA World Cup at Stanford Stadium and will host matches during the 2026 FIFA World Cup at Levi's Stadium.  The Bay Area hosted some of the soccer competition during the 1984 Summer Olympics and will do so again during the 2028 Summer Olympics.  

Outside of major league sports, the Bay Area is home to three minor league franchises. In hockey, the San Jose Barracuda play in the American Hockey League (AHL) and are the top affiliate of the San Jose Sharks, sharing the same rink at the SAP Center in San Jose. In baseball, the San Jose Giants in the California League of Minor League Baseball (MiLB) are the Low-A affiliate of the San Francisco Giants, playing out of the San Jose Municipal Stadium. In soccer, the Oakland Roots in the USL Championship, the second division of American soccer, currently play at Laney Field at Laney College.

In terms of collegiate sports, six Bay Area universities are members of NCAA Division I, the highest level of college sports in the country. All three football-playing schools in the Bay Area are in the Football Bowl Subdivision, the highest level of NCAA college football. The California Golden Bears and Stanford Cardinal compete in the Pac-12 Conference, and the San Jose State Spartans compete in the Mountain West Conference. The Cardinal and Golden Bears are intense rivals, with their football teams competing annually in the Big Game for the Stanford Axe. One of the most famous games in the rivalry occurred in 1982, when the Golden Bears defeated the Cardinal on a last-second return kickoff known as "The Play".

The Bay Area has an ideal climate for outdoor recreation, such that activities like hiking, cycling and jogging are popular among locals. Extensive public tennis facilities are available in Golden Gate Park and Dolores Park, as well as at smaller neighborhood courts throughout the city. San Francisco residents have often ranked among the fittest in the U.S. Boating, sailing, windsurfing and kitesurfing are among the popular activities on San Francisco Bay, and the city maintains a yacht harbor in the Marina District. The St. Francis Yacht Club and Golden Gate Yacht Club are located in the Marina Harbor, while the South Beach Yacht Club is located next to Oracle Park. The Bay Area was host to the 2013 America's Cup. Other Bay Area yacht clubs include the Alameda Yacht Club, Berkeley Yacht Club, Corinthian Yacht Club in Tiburon, Oakland Yacht Club, Presidio Yacht Club, Sausalito Yacht Club and Sequoia Yacht Club in Redwood City.

See also

List of metropolitan areas of the United States
Coastal California
Statistical area (United States)
Lists of San Francisco Bay Area topics
Timeline of the San Francisco Bay Area
Sacramento metropolitan area

References

External links

Discover the Bay Area website run by Discover California
Bay Area Tourism Guide by the San Francisco Chamber of Commerce

 
Regions of California
Geography of Northern California
Metropolitan areas of California